The Pursuit Begins When This Portrayal of Life Ends, commonly referred to as The Pursuit, is the second studio album by Canadian rock band Evans Blue, released on July 24, 2007. The album was leaked onto the internet on May 23, 2007, two months before its official release.

It's the band's first album to feature Howard Davis on drums and the last album with Kevin Matisyn as the lead singer of the group, before current lead singer, Dan Chandler, replaced him. The Pursuit has a heavier tone overall compared to the band's debut album.

The album sold over 30,000 copies in its first three weeks on-sale.

Track listing

Unplugged Melody
The Unplugged Melody was included with the Canadian release of the album, containing acoustic versions of songs from The Melody and the Energetic Nature of Volume, with the exception of the Sarah McLachlan cover, "Possession". For a limited time, this DVD was included with each purchase of The Pursuit Begins When This Portrayal of Life Ends from Best Buy, and contains commentary from lead singer, Matisyn, as well as a making-of documentary for the second album.

Album credits
All songs written by K. Clarkson (Matisyn) / J. Lauzon / V. Tanaskovic except "Caught A Lite Sneeze," which was written by Tori Amos.

Band
 Kevin Matisyn – lead vocals
 Parker Lauzon – rhythm guitar
 Vlad Tanaskovic – lead guitar
 Joe Pitter – bass
 Howard Davis – drums

Additional musicians
 Michael Langford – percussion, engineer
 Kevin Fox – cello ("Pin-Up", "Painted")
 Konrad Kustiak – piano ("Pin-Up", "Painted")

Production
 Trevor Kustiak – producer
 Mark Makowy – mixing
 Michael Langford – engineer, digital editing
 Tom Bender – assistant
 William Paden HENSLEY – digital editing, mixing assistant
 P.R. Brown – design, photography
 Bob Vosgien – mastering
 Geoffrey Weiss – A&R
 Michael Barbiero – mixing
 Michael Brauer – mixing
 Mick Guzauski – mixing

References 

2007 albums
Evans Blue albums